John Allen, 3rd Viscount Allen (11 June 1713 – 25 May 1745), was an Irish peer and politician.

He was the son of Joshua Allen, 2nd Viscount Allen. Allen was a member of parliament (MP) for Carysfort from 1733 until 1742, when he succeeded his father as Viscount Allen. In 1744, he was elected Grandmaster of the Grand Lodge of Ireland, a post he held for the next three years.

He never married and, on his death, his titles passed to his cousin.

References

1713 births
1745 deaths
Irish MPs 1727–1760
Members of the Parliament of Ireland (pre-1801) for County Wicklow constituencies
Members of the Irish House of Lords
John 3